Bojan Trajkovski (born 11 September 1986) is a Macedonian professional basketball player who plays for Feniks 2010 of the Macedonian First League. He is a member of the Macedonian national basketball team.

Pro career
Trajkovski started his pro career with Macedonian Team Balkan Steel in 2002.

Bojan is a 2.08 m big man capable of playing the power forward and center positions. His natural position, being the power forward spot is where he is most comfortable. His size does not limit him to playing on the block, he is very much capable of knocking down shots from long-range, most notably 3-pointers (like many of the big men from this region).

On 2 December 2016, he signed for Karpos Sokoli 

On 11 August 2017, he signed with MZT Skopje.

On 1 June 2018, he signed with Hungarian team Atomerőmű SE.

National team
Trajkovski has also been a member of the Macedonian national basketball team since 2003, when he represented Macedonia at the FIBA Europe Under-16 Championship. He has competed with the team at all FIBA levels of U16, U18, U20, even the Senior team.
Bojan Trajkovski is candidate for the Macedonian national basketball team for the 2012 FIBA World Olympic Qualifying Tournament in Caracas, Venezuela. According to the Coach Marjan Lazovski, Trajkovski, along with Aleksandar Kostoski and Kiril Nikolovski are likely to be the newest additions to the Senior team.

References

External links
Bojan Trajkovski at globalsportsplaza.com
Bojan Trajkovski at eurobasket.com

1986 births
Living people
ABA League players
Atomerőmű SE players
Centers (basketball)
Czarni Słupsk players
KB Prishtina players
KK MZT Skopje players
KK Rabotnički players
Macedonian men's basketball players
People from Makedonska Kamenica Municipality
Power forwards (basketball)